The College of Traditional Chinese Medicine is a degree awarding college working as a subsidiary of the Xinjiang Medical University, is the only autonomous institution of a higher Chinese medicine study in Urumqi. On May 31, 1985 the State Education Commission sanctioned the amount for the construction of the college building. In 1986, a new hospital building's construction started for the "under construction" college. On April 17, 1987 the Xinjiang government merged the college under the administration of the Xinjiang Medical University.

See also
 List of universities in Xinjiang

References

Xinjiang Medical University
Educational institutions established in 1956
Education in Ürümqi
Medical schools in China
1956 establishments in China